USS Pompano (SS-181), a United States Porpoise-class submarine, was the second ship of the United States Navy to be named for the pompano.

Construction and commissioning 
Pompano′s keel was laid down on 14 January 1936 by the Mare Island Navy Yard in California. She was launched on 11 March 1937, sponsored by Mrs. Isaac I. Yates, wife of Captain Isaac I. Yates, manager of Mare Island Navy Yard. Pompano was commissioned on 12 June 1937.

Engine problems 
Six boats were built in this group, with three different diesel engine designs from different makers. Pompano was fitted with H.O.R. (Hooven-Owens-Rentschler) 8-cylinder double-acting engines that were a license-built version of the MAN auxiliary engines of the cruiser Leipzig. Owing to the limited space available within the submarines, either opposed-piston or, in this case, double-acting engines were favoured for being more compact. Pompanos engines were a complete failure and were wrecked during trials before even leaving the Mare Island Navy Yard. Pompano was laid up for eight months until 1938 while the engines were replaced. Even then the engines were regarded as unsatisfactory and were replaced by Fairbanks-Morse opposed piston engines in 1942.

Pompanos engines were a unique prototype of the H.O.R. engine, having 8 cylinders. An inherent problem with double-acting cylinders, owing to the piston rod reducing the piston area on one side, is an imbalance in the force on each side of the piston. The H.O.R. engines were plagued by vibration and other problems as a result. While Pompano was still being built, the Salmon-class submarines were ordered. Three of these were built by Electric Boat, with a 9-cylinder development of the same H.O.R. engine. The 9-cylinder arrangement was an attempt to re-balance the engine, so reducing the overall effect of vibration across the engine. Although not as great a failure as Pompanos engines, this version was still troublesome and the boats were later re-engined with the same General Motors 16-248 two-stroke V16 Diesel engines as their sister boats. Other Electric Boat constructed submarines of the Sargo and Seadragon classes were also built with these 9-cylinder H.O.R. engines, but later re-engined.

Service history
In the years preceding World War II, Pompano operated out of Mare Island off the West Coast of the United States, training her crew and patrolling in a constant state of readiness.

Although the submarine was awarded a battle star for the attack on Pearl Harbor, she had not yet arrived from Mare Island. Reaching port shortly after the attack, she sailed from Pearl Harbor on 18 December 1941 for her first war patrol, devoted mainly to reconnoitering the eastern Marshall Islands for an aircraft carrier strike in January. Aircraft from  bombed her in error on 20 December, but she escaped damage.

Pompano arrived off Wake Island on 1 January 1942 to gather intelligence, approaching close enough to see Japanese machine gun posts. On 8 January, "bedevilled by breakdowns in her temperamental H.O.R. engines" she inspected Bikar and subsequently viewed several other islands of the group.

She sighted several large ships protected by patrol craft in the harbor at Wotje. On 12 January, one of these stood out: Yawata, with four escorts. Pompano fired four Mark 14 torpedoes for two hits, and the target apparently broke up, disappearing from view. Five days later, when one of the patrol boats steamed out of the harbor, Pompano worked her way between him and the channel. Both torpedoes exploded prematurely (a constant problem for the Mark 6 exploder), foiling her first attack. The torpedoes missed, and the destroyer delivered an ineffective depth charging.

After thoroughly reconnoitering Maloelap, Pompano departed on 24 January, arriving at Pearl Harbor on 31 January. On the same day, aided by her reports, the fast carriers of the Pacific Fleet struck the Marshall Islands.

On her next patrol, to Japanese home waters, Pompano left Pearl Harbor on 20 April 1942 (with a load of older Mark 10 torpedoes, due to production shortages at Newport Torpedo Station), refueled at Midway Island, and entered her area 7 May patrolling the sea lanes west of Okinawa and in the East China Sea. Shipping was scarce, but on 24 May, she caught a large sampan and sent it down with gunfire. On the next day, after chasing for seven hours and fighting a motor fire in the process, she torpedoed Tokyo Maru, which exploded and sank.

As Pompano shifted her patrol area to the main route between Japan and the East Indies, a large transport escorted by one destroyer caught her eye on 30 May.

With her fuel getting low and a strong possibility of not being able to refuel at Midway Island on the way back because of the Japanese attempt to invade the island, Pompano began to work eastward. On the morning of 3 June, she found a small inter-island steamer, setting the vessel afire with gunfire.

On 5 June, while on the shipping route between Japan and the Mariana Islands, the submarine caught a trawler and sank it with gunfire. Two days later, word arrived the Japanese fleet, decisively defeated in the Battle of Midway, was fleeing toward Japan. Pompano took up a position to intercept them, but made no contact. On 13 June 1942, she put into Midway for refueling, and on 18 June arrived in Pearl Harbor. She was credited with sinking five ships for a total of 16,500 tons; postwar, only two for 8,900 tons were confirmed.

After a refit - and a change of command, to Willis M. Thomas - she sailed from Pearl Harbor again on 19 July, bound for Japan, on her third war patrol. By 3 August, she was in her area, and began patrolling within four miles (7.5 km) of the coast. A few minutes past midnight on the morning of 7 August, she launched four torpedoes at a large freighter, but all missed.

Two days later, a destroyer sighted Pompano, and opened fire. As Pompano ducked under, shells could be heard hitting the water. Soon a heavy barrage of depth charges exploded close aboard. Rising water in the engine room necessitated starting the pumps, which brought another heavy barrage. After running aground twice while attempting to escape, wiping off the sonar heads and with her battery almost exhausted, she surfaced, determined to fight on, only  from shore, evaded the ashcan and hastily cleared the area.

Undaunted, at noon on 12 August 1942, she dove and set up on a freighter, which was coming into position when Pompano sighted an enemy destroyer coming down between the sub and her target. Both sets of screws stopped immediately. As Pompano closed the freighter, it settled below, evidently a victim of the second torpedo.

Another attack on 21 August failed when a convoy escort kept Pompano down while three freighters passed. On the morning of 23 August, she launched another torpedo attack on a large passenger freighter, only to have all three torpedoes miss. The target replied with his deck gun.

The last attack of the patrol came while en route Midway when, on the  circle from Tokyo, Pompano sighted Naval Auxiliary 163 lying to. Since the vessel was of shallow draft, and since there were no other enemy forces visible, the submarine surfaced and engaged with deck guns, sinking the enemy an hour later. Pompano sighted an unidentified periscope the next morning, but it disappeared before she could attack. The ship arrived Midway on 8 September and Pearl Harbor four days later.

An overhaul at Mare Island Navy Yard, including the installation of new main engines, kept the ship in the yard until 18 December 1942. Sailing back to Pearl Harbor, she departed on her fourth war patrol on 16 January 1943. The Marshalls were her first objective, and at dawn on 25 January, she was off Kwajalein. After reconnoitering the area, she moved on to Truk to begin patrolling.

Catching a tanker with only one escort on 30 January, she damaged it with torpedoes. Another tanker came in view on 4 February, but only one of the stern torpedoes hit; damaged, it managed to make port. Moving back to the Marshalls, Pompano sighted another tanker on the morning of 18 February. Two hits slowed the Japanese down, but depth charging held Pompano down until her target had escaped. After reconnoitering Rongerik, Rongelap, and Bikini Atoll, she returned home, mooring at Midway on 28 February. She would get credit for no sinkings this time out.

She left Midway again on 19 March, bound for Tokyo. Pompano fired six torpedoes at long range , and was credited with damage for 28,900 tons (denied postwar). She made only one other attack, spent two-thirds of the patrol fighting rough weather, and returned to Midway on 5 May, then to Pearl Harbor five days later.

On 6 June, the submarine was underway again from Pearl Harbor for the Nagoya, Japan. Stopping briefly at Midway to top up supplies, she entered her area on 19 June, patrolling across traffic lanes from Japan to the south. Next day, she encountered a convoy, firing four torpedoes with no hits. On 7 July, she came upon two destroyers and, showing surprising aggressiveness, launched three torpedoes at each, missing every time. Two days after that, an ill-advised long shot at a three-ship convoy also missed, while on 10 July, a tanker escaped thanks to two erratic Mark 14s. Her last two torpedoes were extreme-range misses against a freighter. A good-sized sampan was sunk with gunfire on 17 July. Pompano ended the unsuccessful patrol at Midway on 28 July.

Pompano left Midway on 20 August, bound for Hokkaidō and Honshū. She was never heard from again, and when she failed to return, was presumed lost. The Japanese knew she was in her area, however, for two ships fell to her torpedoes during September: Akama Maru on 3 September, and Taiko Maru on 25 September. The enemy made no anti-submarine attacks during this period in Pompanos area, so newly-laid mines in the vicinity, not known to U.S. Navy intelligence until after she sailed, probably sank her. Pompano was stricken from the Naval Vessel Register on 12 January 1944.

The official version is that she was lost while patrolling off the coasts of Hokkaido and Honshu, probably to Japanese mines. The date usually given (27 September) is an approximate one. However Japanese records show that a submarine was sunk on 17 September by air attack off the Aomori Prefecture near Shiriya Zaki. Though it is not certain the boat was actually sunk here, it must be taken into consideration since it could only have been directed against Pompano since this was within her patrol area and there were no other submarines operating in that area. The Japanese said a seaplane based on Ominato attacked a surfaced sub which returned fire (this is critical since it leaves little doubt about what the plane attacked) then dived. The Japanese minelayer Ashizaki dropped depth charges the following day on a spot where oil was surfacing, bringing up more oil.

Although the fate of the Pompano has been unknown for years, new evidence from Japan suggests it may have been hit by depth charges from members of the Japanese Navy following an oil slick on top of the water — which they took as an indication there was a submarine below. A possibility is that she was sunk on September 17, 1943, by a bomb and depth-charge attack in the Shiriyasaki Sea, off Aomori Prefecture, at northeast Honshu Island, by a Japanese seaplane and surface vessels.  The seaplane spotted and attacked a surfaced submarine, which returned gunfire.  Oil rose to the surface after the attack.  Consecutive depth-charge attacks were then made by five surface vessels on the submerged submarine, which was stopped and possibly sunk.  A Tabular Record of Movement for one of the Japanese surface vessels indicates the submarine was possibly the Pompano. (Ibid.; Also see: Holmes, Wilfred J., Double-Edged Secrets: U. S. Naval Intelligence Operations in the Pacific during World War II, p. 156; Hackett, Bob and Sander Kingsepp and Peter Cundall, "IJN Minelayer ISHIZAKI: Tabular Record of Movement," published online at http://www.combinedfleet.com/Ishizaki_t.htm (accessed on October 11, 2011); Miller, Vernon J., "U. S. Submarine Losses," issue 44, p. 46.)

Awards
 Asiatic-Pacific Campaign Medal with seven battle stars for World War II service

Notes

References

Citations

Bibliography
 Hinman, Charles R., and Douglas E. Campbell. The Submarine Has No Friends: Friendly Fire Incidents Involving U.S. Submarines During World War II. Syneca Research Group, Inc., 2019. .

External links
On Eternal Patrol: USS Pompano

United States Porpoise-class submarines
World War II submarines of the United States
Lost submarines of the United States
Ships sunk by mines
Ships built in Vallejo, California
1937 ships
Ships lost with all hands
Maritime incidents in December 1941
Maritime incidents in September 1943
Friendly fire incidents of World War II